Ludwig Freiherr von Vogelsang (born 12 December 1748 in Brussels; died 28 June 1822 in Fortress Josefov) was an Austrian infantry commander during the French Revolutionary and Napoleonic Wars.

References

External links 
 Biography Allgemeine Deutsche Biographie (German Wikisource)

Austrian Empire military leaders of the French Revolutionary Wars
Austrian Empire commanders of the Napoleonic Wars
Barons of Austria
1748 births
1822 deaths